The Churchill River Group is a geologic group in Manitoba. It preserves fossils dating back to the Ordovician period.

See also

 List of fossiliferous stratigraphic units in Manitoba

References
 

Ordovician Manitoba